The A238 mine is a large open pit mine located in the western part of Mauritania. A238 represents one of the largest uranium reserves in Mauritania having estimated reserves of 45 million tonnes of ore grading 0.02% uranium.

References 

Uranium mines in Mauritania